The Crown of Napoleon III was a crown that was made for Napoleon III, Emperor of the French. Although he did not have a coronation ceremony, a crown was made for him on the occasion of the 1855 Exposition Universelle in Paris. The gold crown had eagle-shaped arches and others in the form of palmettes, set with diamonds, and topped by a monde.

During the same period, a consort crown was made for his empress consort, Eugénie de Montijo, which is known as the Crown of Empress Eugénie. After Napoleon III was overthrown in 1870, following the Franco-Prussian War, he and his wife lived in exile at Chislehurst in England, where he died in 1873.

Most of the French Crown Jewels were sold by the Third Republic in 1885, including the Crown of Napoleon III. However, the Crown of Empress Eugénie was returned to the former empress, who bequeathed it to Princess Marie-Clotilde Bonaparte. It subsequently came up for auction in 1988, after which it was donated by  Roberto Polo to the Louvre museum in Paris, where it is now on display.

See also 
 Crown
 Crown jewels
 Regalia

References 

French monarchy
Napoleon III
French Crown Jewels